Fernand Boone (1 August 1934 – 11 September 2013) was a Belgian football goalkeeper who won the Belgian Golden Shoe in 1967 while at Club Brugge.  He played 8 times for the national team between 1967 and 1968, starting in a 1-0 friendly win against the Netherlands on 16 April 1967.  He was considered as the substitute for the Standard Liège goalkeeper Jean Nicolay for the national team.

References

External links
 

Belgian footballers
Club Brugge KV players
1934 births
2013 deaths

Association football goalkeepers
Belgium international footballers